David Cary Jacobson (born October 9, 1951) is an American lawyer who served as the 29th United States Ambassador to Canada.

Biography
A graduate of Johns Hopkins University and Georgetown University Law Center, he spent much of his career working in the Chicago offices of Sonnenschein Nath & Rosenthal, a law firm.

He became a fundraiser for Barack Obama's presidential campaign in 2008. He subsequently worked on Obama's presidential transition team in the Office of Presidential Personnel.

Jacobson's appointment as United States Ambassador to Canada was confirmed by the United States Senate. His confirmation hearings began on August 5, 2009 and the final confirmation occurred September 23, 2009 by unanimous consent.  His credentials were accepted by Governor General Michaëlle Jean on October 2, 2009, and he took his post as ambassador.

On May 21, 2013, Jacobson announced his departure from the Embassy after nearly four years as Ambassador to Canada, effective July 15.

In October 2013, he became vice chairman of the Canadian-American BMO Financial Group.

References

External links

 U.S. Embassay, Ottawa: Blog of the U.S. Ambassador
 

Living people
Illinois lawyers
Ambassadors of the United States to Canada
1951 births
Lawyers from Chicago
Johns Hopkins University alumni
Georgetown University Law Center alumni
Illinois Democrats
Jewish American attorneys
21st-century American Jews